Khadro ( کڏڙو, Sindhi) is a town that is located in Sub-District Sinjhoro, Sanghar District of Sindh Province, Pakistan. It is an agricultural town that primarily produces rice and cotton. The tomb of Hazrat Hameer Faqeer is located there. The Peoples lands are irrigated by the canal Jamrao, which is built on the Nara Canal.  The town population is approximately 10,000. Hindus population is 5% in Khadro.

Cricket is mostly played in Khadro. Volleyball is becoming another popular sport. and other is snooker game.

It is a 160 years old village to town. But its population is low because of break down of canal in 1999–2001.
Khadro Sindh's old name is Khadaro.
Phase of this city is to its landlords.

Location
Khadro is located between Sanghar, Nawabshah.
These are two districts and that the Khadro is located between these two districts.
Nawabsha is 37 kilometres away.
Sanghar is 26 kilometres away.
Its main another thing is transportation stop.

Transportation
Khadro is a main stop for travelers of N S E W people under its area. Most of the transportation is done by buses, vans, and cars.
Khadro has a Railway station, Khadro railway station

Agriculture
Most of lands are average producers.

Mosque 
It has 9 Mosques.

Education 

GBHSS High school
GGHSS School
Sindhi government girls school
Urdu government primary school

Gallery

References 

Sanghar District